Thane Alvin Gash (born September 1, 1965) is a former professional American football player who played safety for four seasons for the Cleveland Browns and two seasons for the San Francisco 49ers in the National Football League (NFL). He had his best season in 1989, when he intercepted three passes and returned two of those for touchdowns.

References

1965 births
Living people
People from Hendersonville, North Carolina
Players of American football from North Carolina
African-American players of American football
American football safeties
East Tennessee State Buccaneers football players
Cleveland Browns players
San Francisco 49ers players
21st-century African-American people
20th-century African-American sportspeople